Critzer is an unincorporated community in Linn County, Kansas, United States.

History
Critzer US Post Office was established on January 1, 1890, and remained open until September 15, 1906. Critzer is named after an engineer who worked for the Missouri Pacific Railroad. He later moved to the state of Washington.

Geography
Critzer is located at  (38.140029, -94.912744), six miles (9.7 km) west of the county seat, Mound City.

Education
A one-room school operated in Critzer from 1875 to 1941.

References

Further reading

External links
 Critzer - KANSAS - A Cyclopedia of State History, Embracing Events, Institutions, Industries, Counties, Cities, Towns, Prominent Persons, Etc. 1912
 Linn County maps: Current, Historic, KDOT

Unincorporated communities in Linn County, Kansas
Unincorporated communities in Kansas